John Bowers (born John E. Bowersox; December 25, 1885 – November 17, 1936) was an American stage and silent film actor who starred in 94 films including several short subjects. He has been identified as being an inspiration for the character Norman Maine in A Star Is Born (1937).

Early life and career
 
Born John E. Bowersox in Garrett, Indiana, to George and Ida Bowersox, John Bowers attended Huntington Business College in Huntington, Indiana, where he became interested in acting. He joined a stock stage group and traveled until he landed in New York in 1912, where he appeared in Broadway productions. Bowers began his film career in 1914. Within five years, he became one of the most popular leading men. During his career he co-starred frequently with Marguerite De La Motte, whom he later married. 

Like many silent film stars, Bowers saw his career collapse when talkies became the standard.

Death
On November 17, 1936, Bowers heard that his old friend Henry Hathaway was directing Gary Cooper in Souls at Sea on and off the shore of Santa Catalina. The 50-year-old actor rented a 16-foot sloop and sailed to the island, hoping to land a part in the picture, only to learn that it had been cast. He never returned to shore, and his body was found on the beach at Santa Monica, California. Chuck Palahniuk claims folk legend dictates John simply walked into the ocean upon hearing this news.

His life, and particularly his death, is identified as inspiration for the character Norman Maine in A Star Is Born (1937). That character was also based on Norman Kerry. 

For his contributions to the film industry, Bowers received a motion pictures star on the Hollywood Walk of Fame at 1709 Vine Street in 1960.

Selected filmography

References

External links

 
 
 
 John Bowers at Virtual History

1885 births
1936 suicides
20th-century American male actors
Male actors from Indiana
American male film actors
American male silent film actors
American male stage actors
Suicides by drowning in the United States
Suicides in California
People from DeKalb County, Indiana
1936 deaths